Carysville is an unincorporated community in Adams Township, Champaign County, in the U.S. state of Ohio.

History
Carysville was platted in 1830 by Calvin Cary, and named for him. A post office called Carysville was established in 1837, and remained in operation until 1901.

References

Unincorporated communities in Champaign County, Ohio
Unincorporated communities in Ohio